Solway is a city in Beltrami County, Minnesota, United States. The population was 96 at the 2010 census.  Solway serves as a bedroom community for nearby Bemidji.

History
A post office has called Solway has been in operation since 1898. The city was named after the Solway Firth.

Geography

Demographics

2010 census
As of the census of 2010, there were 96 people, 32 households, and 26 families living in the city. The racial makeup of the city was 96.9% White and 3.1% from two or more races.

There were 32 households, of which 46.9% had children under the age of 18 living with them, 62.5% were married couples living together, 3.1% had a female householder with no husband present, 15.6% had a male householder with no wife present, and 18.8% were non-families. 15.6% of all households were made up of individuals, and 6.2% had someone living alone who was 65 years of age or older. The average household size was 3.00 and the average family size was 3.19.

The median age in the city was 35 years. 33.3% of residents were under the age of 18; 6.2% were between the ages of 18 and 24; 21.9% were from 25 to 44; 25.1% were from 45 to 64; and 13.5% were 65 years of age or older. The gender makeup of the city was 49.0% male and 51.0% female.

2000 census
As of the census of 2000, there were 69 people, 27 households, and 17 families living in the city. The racial makeup of the city was 98.55% White and 1.45% Native American.

There were 27 households, of which 33.3% had children under the age of 18 living with them, 48.1% were married couples living together, 11.1% had a female householder with no husband present, and 37.0% were non-families. 29.6% of all households were made up of individuals, and 18.5% had someone living alone who was 65 years of age or older. The average household size was 2.56 and the average family size was 3.24.

In the city, the population was spread out, with 31.9% under the age of 18, 5.8% from 18 to 24, 20.3% from 25 to 44, 29.0% from 45 to 64, and 13.0% who were 65 years of age or older. The median age was 32 years. For every 100 females, there were 122.6 males. For every 100 females age 18 and over, there were 123.8 males.

The median income for a household in the city was $25,625, and the median income for a family was $34,375. Males had a median income of $35,625 versus $11,875 for females. The per capita income for the city was $19,912. There were 15.8% of families and 29.4% of the population living below the poverty line, including 55.0% of under eighteens and none of those over 64.

References

Cities in Beltrami County, Minnesota
Cities in Minnesota